Anne Sullivan Macy (born as Johanna Mansfield Sullivan; April 14, 1866 – October 20, 1936) was an American teacher best known  for being the instructor and lifelong companion of Helen Keller.

At the age of five, Sullivan contracted trachoma, an eye disease, which left her partially blind and without reading or writing skills. She received her education as a student of the Perkins School for the Blind. Soon after graduation at age 20, she became a teacher to Keller.

Childhood
On , Sullivan was born in Feeding Hills, Agawam, Massachusetts, United States, North America. The name on her baptismal certificate was Johanna Mansfield Sullivan but she was called Anne or Annie from birth. She was the eldest child of Thomas and Alice (Cloesy) Sullivan, who had emigrated from Ireland to the United States during the Great Famine.

When she was five years old, Sullivan contracted the bacterial eye disease trachoma, which caused many painful infections and over time made her nearly blind. When she was eight, her mother died from tuberculosis, and her father abandoned the children two years later for fear that he could not raise them on his own. She and her younger brother, James (Jimmie), were sent to the run-down and overcrowded almshouse in Tewksbury, Massachusetts, today part of Tewksbury Hospital, and their younger sister, Mary, was left to an aunt. Jimmie had a weak hip condition and then died from tuberculosis four months into their stay. Anne remained at Tewksbury after his death and endured two unsuccessful eye operations.

In 1875, as a result of reports of cruelty to inmates at Tewksbury, including sexually perverted practices and cannibalism, the Massachusetts Board of State Charities launched an investigation into the institution. The investigation was led by Franklin Benjamin Sanborn, then chairman of the board, and Samuel Gridley Howe, founder of the Perkins School for the Blind in Boston.

In February 1877, Anne was sent to the Soeurs de la Charité hospital in Lowell, Massachusetts, where she had another unsuccessful operation. While there, she helped the nuns in the wards and went on errands in the community until July of that year, when she was sent to the city infirmary, where she had one more unsuccessful operation. She was then transferred back to Tewksbury under duress. Instead of returning to the facility for predominantly ill and insane patients, she was housed with single mothers and unmarried pregnant women.

In 1880, during a subsequent inspection of Tewksbury by Franklin Benjamin Sanborn, now State Inspector of Charities, Anne implored of him to allow her to be admitted to the Perkins School for the Blind. Within a matter of months, her plea was granted.

Education

On October 7, 1880, Anne began her studies at the Perkins School. Although her first years at Perkins were humiliating because of her rough manners, she managed to connect with a few teachers and made progress with her learning.

While at Perkins, Anne befriended Laura Bridgman, a graduate of Perkins and the first blind and deaf person to have been educated there; Anne learned the manual alphabet from Laura. During her time there, she had a series of eye operations that significantly improved her vision.

In June 1886, graduating at age 20 as the valedictorian of her class, Anne stated:

Career

The summer after Anne had graduated, the director of Perkins School for the Blind, Michael Anagnos, was contacted by Arthur Keller, Helen Keller's father, who was in search of a teacher for his seven-year-old blind and deaf daughter. Anagnos immediately recommended Sullivan for this position and she began her work on March 3, 1887, at the Kellers' home located in Albama. As soon as she arrived she argued with Helen's parents about the Civil War and over the fact that they had owned slaves. However she also quickly connected with Helen. It was the beginning of a 49-year relationship: Sullivan evolved from teacher to governess and finally to companion and friend.

Sullivan's curriculum involved a strict schedule, with constant introduction of new vocabulary; however she quickly changed her teaching method after seeing it did not suit Keller. Instead she began to teach her vocabulary based on her own interests, by spelling each word out into Keller's palm; within six months this method proved to be working, since Keller had learned 575 words, some multiplication tables and the Braille system.

Sullivan strongly encouraged Helen's parents to send her to the Perkins School, where she could have an appropriate education. Once they had agreed Sullivan took Keller to Boston in 1888 and stayed with her there. Sullivan continued to teach her bright protégée, who soon became famous for her remarkable progress. With the help of the school's director, Anagnos, Keller became a public symbol for the school, helping to increase its funding and donations and making it the most famous and sought-after school for the blind in the country. However an accusation of plagiarism against Keller greatly upset Sullivan: she left and never returned but did remain influential to the school. Sullivan also remained a close companion to Keller and continued to assist in her education, which ultimately included a degree from Radcliffe College.

Personal life

On May 3, 1905, Anne  married Harvard University instructor and literary critic John Albert Macy (1877–1932), who had helped Keller with her publications. When she married, Anne was already living with Keller as her personal teacher, so Macy moved into the household of both women. However, within a few years, the marriage began to disintegrate. By 1914, they separated, though he is listed as living as a "lodger" with them in the 1920 U.S. Census. As the years progressed after their separation, Macy appears to have faded from her life, and the two never officially divorced. Macy died in 1932 of a heart attack. Sullivan never remarried.

Awards
In 1932, Keller and Sullivan were each awarded honorary fellowships from the Educational Institute of Scotland. They were also awarded honorary degrees from Temple University. In 1955, Keller was awarded an honorary degree from Harvard University, and in 1956, the director's cottage at the Perkins School was named the Keller-Macy Cottage.

In 2003, Sullivan was inducted into the National Women's Hall of Fame.

Death
Sullivan had been seriously visually impaired for almost all of her life, but by 1901, after having a stroke at age 35, she became completely blind. On October 15, 1936, she had a coronary thrombosis, fell into a coma, and died five days later at the age of 70 in the Forest Hills neighborhood of Queens, New York, with Keller holding her hand. Keller described Sullivan as being very agitated during her last month of life, but during the last week, she was said to return to her normal generous self. Sullivan was cremated and her ashes interred in a memorial at the National Cathedral in Washington, D.C. She was the first woman to be recognized for her achievements in this way. When Keller died in 1968, she was cremated as well and her ashes were interred alongside those of Sullivan.

Media representation
Sullivan is the main character in The Miracle Worker by William Gibson, originally produced for television in 1957, in which she was portrayed by Teresa Wright. The Miracle Worker then moved to Broadway and later was produced as a 1962 feature film. Both the play and the film featured Anne Bancroft as Sullivan. Patty Duke, who played Keller on Broadway and in the 1962 film, later played Sullivan in a 1979 television remake. Blythe Danner portrayed her in The Miracle Continues and Roma Downey portrayed her in the TV movie Monday After the Miracle (1998). Alison Elliott portrayed her in a 2000 television movie. Alison Pill played her on Broadway in the short-lived 2010 revival, with Abigail Breslin as Keller.

References

Bibliography
Tewksbury Almshouse patient records
McGinnity, B. L., J. Seymour-Ford, and K. J. Andries. "Anne Sullivan". Perkins School for the Blind. February 14, 2014. Accessed February 14, 2014. Anne Sullivan .

Further reading

External links

 Anne Sullivan Macy: Miracle Worker, a multimedia museum from the American Foundation for the Blind
 
 
 
 Helen Keller Kids Museum Online
 Anne Sullivan at Perkins School for the Blind
 

1866 births
1936 deaths
19th-century American educators
20th-century American educators
19th-century American women educators
20th-century American women educators
American people of Irish descent
American governesses
American blind people
Blind educators
Educators of the blind
Educators from Massachusetts
Language teachers
Helen Keller
Burials at Washington National Cathedral
People from Queens, New York
People from Agawam, Massachusetts
People from Tewksbury, Massachusetts
Deaths from coronary thrombosis
Educators from New York City
Educators of the deaf